Bob Kress (1929–2007) was an American aircraft engineer. 

He is specially know for being engineering manager for the project of the Grumman F-14 Tomcat. He joined Grumman in 1951.

He worked on the:

F9F Cougar
XF10F Jaguar swing wing experimental fighter 
F11F-1 Tiger
proposed STOL ASW flying boats
OV-1 Mohawk Observation Aircraft
 design of STOL and VTOL aircraft
 F-111B TFX 
 LM Systems Simulation for the lunar module
 LM Guidance Navigation and Control.
 From the F-14A's inception until 1971, he was the program's engineering manager, after which he was appointed F-14 deputy development program manager.

He can be seen describing the development of the now-retired F-14 into a maneuvering dogfighter on Modern Marvels: F14 DVD, and F-14D Tomcat vs. F/A18 E/F Super Hornet Two experts say the Super Hornet isn't so super By Bob Kress and Rear Adm. Paul Gillcrist, U.S. Navy (Ret.) 

He is credited with the idea of a computer controlled wing sweep mechanism that could be used in combat maneuvering.

1929 births
2007 deaths
American aerospace engineers
20th-century American engineers